Red Lantern may refer to:


Arts and entertainment

Film
Lentera Merah (Red Lantern), a 2006 Indonesian film
Raise the Red Lantern, a 1991 Chinese film based on a novella, originally titled Wives and Concubines and  written by Su Tong
The Red Lantern, a 1919 American silent film
The Red Lanterns, a 1963 Greek film

Other arts and entertainment 
Raise the Red Lantern (originally Wives and Concubines), a 1990 Chinese novella written by Su Tong
Red Lantern Corps, a fictional organization in DC comics
The Legend of the Red Lantern, 1967 socialist adaptation of earlier Beijing Opera
The Red Lantern, a game for Nintendo Switch and PC released on 22 October 2020
The Red Lantern, novel by Edith Wherry

Other uses
Banksia caleyi, or red lantern banksia, an Australian shrub
Lanterne rouge, the last place holder in the Tour de France
Red Lanterns (Boxer Uprising) a Chinese fighting group during the Boxer Rebellion
The traditional lanterns in the Chinese Lantern Festival

See also
Red light (disambiguation)